Central Cagayan Agta, also known as Labin Agta, is an Aeta language of northern Cagayan Province, Philippines. It is spoken by the Aeta Negritos in inland areas located to the east and northeast of Baggao (Ethnologue).

Locations
Reid (1994) reports the following locations for Central Cagayan Agta.
Gattaran, Cagayan (including Yaga and Tanglagan)
Sitio Mammit, San Mariano, Lal-Lo, Cagayan
Camonayan, Baggao, Cagayan
However, Ethnologue reports the locations for Central Cagayan Agta: 

 Cagayan Valley Region: Cagayan province inland area,
 East and Northeast from Baggao.

References

Aeta languages
Languages of Cagayan
Cagayan Valley languages